Ivándárda is a village in Baranya county, Hungary.

External links 
http://foldhivatalok.geod.hu/telepules.php?page=3346 

Populated places in Baranya County